The Choice is a 2015 Italian drama film directed by Michele Placido, starring Raoul Bova, Ambra Angiolini, Valeria Solarino and Placido. It is based on the play Grafted (L'innesto) by Luigi Pirandello. It was released in Italy on 2 April 2015 through Lucky Red Distribuzione.

Plot summary
Giorgio and Laura live a difficult loving relationship, because she wants a child, while Giorgio is very indecisive. One night, Laura is returning home after a party, and is attacked and raped. After a few months Laura discovers she is pregnant, and Giorgio is desperate. However, the two reflect on the situation, and they think the bastard child can be the key to their future happiness.

Cast
 Raoul Bova as Giorgio
 Ambra Angiolini as Laura
 Valeria Solarino as  Francesca
 Michele Placido as Emilio Nicotri

Production
The project was first presented at the Co-production Village at the Les Arcs European Film Festival in 2012. The film was produced by Goldenart and was in post-production in August 2014.

Accolades
Italian National Syndicate of Film Journalists - Best Actress - Ambra Angiolini (nominee)

See also   
 List of Italian films of 2013

References

External links
 

2015 films
Italian films based on plays
Films based on works by Luigi Pirandello
Films directed by Michele Placido
Italian drama films
2010s Italian-language films
2015 drama films
2010s Italian films